The 1972 United States presidential election in Iowa took place on November 7, 1972. All 50 states and the District of Columbia were part of the 1972 United States presidential election. Iowa voters chose eight electors to the Electoral College, who voted for president and vice president.

Iowa was won by the Republican nominees, incumbent President Richard Nixon of California and his running mate Vice President Spiro Agnew of Maryland. Nixon and Agnew defeated the Democratic nominees, Senator George McGovern of South Dakota and his running mate U.S. Ambassador Sargent Shriver of Maryland.

Nixon carried Iowa with 57.61 percent of the vote to McGovern's 40.48 percent, a victory margin of 17.13 percent, making Iowa about 6% more Democratic than the nation-at-large. This would be the last time until Donald Trump in 2016 when a Republican presidential candidate won Wapello County and Des Moines County.

Results

Results by county

See also
 United States presidential elections in Iowa

References

Iowa
1972
1972 Iowa elections